Pranav Adani is an Indian businessman and the director of Adani Enterprises. He is a member of the National Council of the Confederation of Indian Industry.

Early life
Adani was born into a Jain family.He is the son of Vinod Shantilal Adani, elder brother of Gautham Adani. He was graduated from Boston University in business management studies. After that, he attended the Owner/President Management Program of Harvard Business School.

Personal life
Pranav Adani is married to Namrata, who runs a non-governmental organization called 'Abhisar'''.

Career
He led a business venture with Singapore's agribusiness group Wilmar International Limited. The Adani Wilmar joint venture owns India's oil brand Fortune. The company hosts upwards of 450 manufacturing plants and a distribution network that spans more than 50 countries including India, Indonesia and China.

Adani became the director of Agro at Adani Enterprises Ltd. As chairman of Adani Agri Logistics Ltd, he also invested in grain storage technology and agricultural logistics. This model is being considered by state and central governments for nationwide adoption.

He is a director of Adani Group's Oil and Gas and City Gas Distribution vertical, Adani Welspun Joint Venture. In August 2009, Adani became a director of Adani Gas Limited, the largest private city gas distribution company in India. He is now its chairman. He has implemented city gas distribution projects in Ahmedabad, Vadodara, Faridabad, and Khurja.

He has ventures in the real estate industry in the cities of Ahmedabad, Mumbai, and Gurgaon. He is involved in building a 600-acre project in Ahmedabad township under the Adani Real Estate Company. He also heads the global coal business of the Adani Group. The project has upcoming expansions in Mumbai and Gurgaon.

In April 2015, Adani was appointed as an additional director of Adani Enterprises. He serves as a member of the Confederation of Indian Industry's National Council on Agriculture and National Council on Fast Moving Consumer Goods.

In January 2018, he addressed the Bengal Global Business Summit alongside Mamata Banerjee. He stated that the Adani Wilmar Limited will invest ₹750 crores ($108.3 million US) in the state. 

In March 2022, he spearheaded the listing of Adani Wilmar at the Bombay Stock Exchange and National Stock Exchange.

He currently holds the following positions at the Adani Group companies:
Executive Director - Adani Enterprises Limited
Chairman of the Board and Managing Director - Adani Agri Fresh Limited
Chairman of the Board - Adani Logistics Limited
Director - Adani Port Infrastructure Private Limited
Member of the Board of Directors - Adani Mining Private Limited
Director - AMG Media Networks
Director - Adani Total Gas Limited

 Philanthropy 
Pranav introduced the 'Garv Hai''' initiative to promote sports and support athletes in India to compete in international tournaments including the 2016 Rio Olympics. A few candidates across India were selected and assisted. In 2015 the campaign supported Indian shot-putter Inderjeet Singh, then Asia's best, for the Asian Championships in China. The list included others like Khushbir Kaur and Shiva Thapa.

The Meadows, a part of the Shantigram, houses a football field in the centre lit by flood lights to promote football.

Garv Hai has been re-launched for a second time as a long-term incubation programme to discover and support athletes in archery, shooting, boxing, wrestling and athletics for 2020 Summer Olympics, 2022 Asian Games and Commonwealth Games.

Awards and recognition
In 2018, Pranav Adani received an Asia's Greatest Leader (2018) nomination from Asia One, reviewed by PWC. The title was presented at Asia's Greatest Brands & Leaders Event in Singapore.
On 19 July 2019, Pranav Adani-led Adani Enterprises received the India's Great Place to Work certification in Mumbai. The award is presented annually by the Great Place to Work Institute in the Mid-Size organisation category. It is the only mining company in the list of top 50 organisations to have won the award for two consecutive years.

References

External links
 Pranav Adani

Living people
Boston University School of Management alumni
21st-century Indian businesspeople
Year of birth missing (living people)
Pranav
Gujarati people